Marigolds in August is a play by South Africa's Athol Fugard.

Plot
The play portrays the tension between three people (two black – one white) trying to make out a living.

The play takes place near Port Elizabeth. Daan (a resident in a nearby township where malnutrition and unemployment are rife) is walking to work at an apartheid whites-only resort where he works as a gardener. He encounters another unemployed black man – Melton – who is desperately looking for work. Daan is worried that Melton's presence will draw attention to him which is a problem as his  passbook is no longer valid.

The pair struggle and argue and the appearance of a white man – Paulus (a snake catcher) – acts as a catalyst.

Daan realises that the apartheid system is often responsible for black-on-black violence. The only way to fight this is solidarity and compassion towards each other.

Film

In 1980, the play was adapted into a film directed by Ross Devenish, with Melton played by John Kani, Athol Fugard as Paulus, and Winston Ntshona as Daan.

Books
 Marigolds in August and The Guest: Two Screenplays, Athol Fugard, Theatre Communications Group Inc., 1992,

Awards
In 1980, it won the Berlin Bear Anniversary Prize at the 30th Berlin International Film Festival.

Notes

External links
 IMDb entry for 1980 film
 NY Times review of the film

South African plays
1980 plays
Plays by Athol Fugard
Plays set in South Africa
South African plays adapted into films
Plays about apartheid